This Is... is a British entertainment show, celebrating the best of British Music. Starring Michael Bublé, JLS, Justin Bieber and Lionel Richie. Presented by various celebrity hosts including Christine Bleakley and Reggie Yates

Episodes

2010 British television series debuts
2012 British television series endings
British television specials
Television series by ITV Studios
ITV (TV network) original programming